USS Johnson may refer to various United States Navy ships:

 , a troop transport in commission from 1944 to 1946
 , later Freight Lighter No. 161, YF-161, and YC-660, a freight lighter in commission from 1918 to 1930
 , a destroyer escort in commission from 1944 to 1946
 , a destroyer escort in commission from 1944 to 1946 and from 1950 to 1957
 , the proposed name and designation of a commercial freight lighter the United States Navy considered for service during World War I but never acquired
 , a tank landing ship in commission from 1944 to 1946 which was renamed USS Johnson County (LST-849) in 1955 while in reserve
 , the third and final , being built by Bath Iron Works
 , the 64th , built by Huntington Ingalls
 , a passenger and cargo ship serving in World War I as the troop transport USS Manchuria (ID-1633) from April 1918 to September 1919, renamed President Johnson 1928 which from 1941 to 1946 saw service as a War Shipping Administration troop transport sometimes mistakenly termed "USS" or Army transport
  an evacuation transport in commission from 1942 to 1946 which served as the United States Army transport USAT Pvt. Elden H. Johnson from 1947 to 1950 and in the U.S. Navys Military Sea Transportation Service as USNS Pvt. Elden H. Johnson from 1950 to 1957

See also
 

United States Navy ship names